Gerd Monica Groop née Riska (born 14 April 1958 in Helsinki) is a Finnish operatic mezzo-soprano. After graduating from the Sibelius Academy, she joined the Finnish National Opera in 1986 where she remains a member. She has sung leading roles as a guest artist with several important theatres internationally, including the Los Angeles Opera, the Palais Garnier, the Royal Opera, London, and the Salzburg Festival to name just a few. She has also recorded the complete songs of Edvard Grieg on BIS Records.

References

1958 births
Singers from Helsinki
Living people
Finnish operatic mezzo-sopranos
20th-century Finnish women opera singers
21st-century Finnish women opera singers